Quévy is a municipality of Wallonia located in the province of Hainaut, Belgium. 

On 1 January 2006, Quévy had a total population of 7,734. The total area is 65.16 km² which gives a population density of 119 inhabitants per km².

The municipality consists of the following districts: Asquillies, Aulnois, Blaregnies, Bougnies, Genly, Givry, Gœgnies-Chaussée, Havay, Quévy-le-Grand, and Quévy-le-Petit.

It is on the former main rail route between Brussels and Paris, and it was the virtual tariff border between the French SNCF and Belgian Railways SNCB.

References

External links
 

Municipalities of Hainaut (province)